Kedaram (pronounced kēdāram) is a rāgam in Carnatic music (musical scale of South Indian classical music). It is a derived scale (janya rāgam) from Shankarabharanam, the 29th Melakarta rāgam.

Structure and Lakshana 
Kedaram is an asymmetric scale that does not contain dhaivatam. It is called a vakra audava-shadava rāgam, in Carnatic music classification. This classification implies that it has 5 notes in ascending scale with zig-zag notes and 6 notes in descending scale. Its ārohaṇa-avarohaṇa structure is as follows (see swaras in Carnatic music for details on below notation and terms):

ārohaṇa : 
avarohaṇa : 

This scale uses the notes shadjam, chatusruti rishabham, antara gandharam, shuddha madhyamam, panchamam and kakali nishadam.

Popular compositions 
Kedaram has been used by many composers for compositions in Carnatic music. Here are some popular compositions in this musical scale.

Rama Neepai by Tyagaraja
marace vadana rama by Saint Tyagaraja
Ananda natana prakasham by Muthuswami Dikshitar
Bhajana seyave oo manasa by Aanayya (brothers)
Bhajare sriramam by Bhadrachala Ramadasu
Rare Ramanulamta by Sri Bhakta Gnanananda Teertha ( Sri Ogirala Veera Raghava Sarma)
Hari Narayana Enu Manave, Simharoopanaada  by Purandara Dasa

Film Songs

Language:Tamil

Notes

Related Ragams
Kedaram is similar to Natbehag of Hindustani classical music. The Kedar of Hindustani music belongs to Kalyan thaat and is quite different from Kedaram.

References

Janya ragas